Camerica was a Canadian video game company founded in 1988.  It released various unlicensed video games and accessories for the Nintendo Entertainment System, such as the Game Genie, and was the North American publisher for British developer Codemasters.

History
The company was owned and operated by David J. Harding and was originally formed in 1988 as a wholesale association with giftware such as Waterford Crystal and Blue Mountain Pottery.

The company entered the video game market, featuring Nintendo World Championship of 1990 winner Thor Aackerlund as the spokesperson, considered one of the first professional gamers. Camerica held the rights to publish most Nintendo Entertainment System games from Codemasters in North America. Camerica also released the Codemasters-designed Game Genie in Canada and the UK. They had a distribution deal with toy company Galoob. The company created several early peripherals for the NES, including the Aladdin Deck Enhancer expansion peripheral and Supersonic: the Joystick a.k.a. Turbotronic, a wireless controller.

Camerica was notable for being an unlicensed distributor, reverse engineering cartridges that would bypass Nintendo's 10NES lock-out chip. Like the circuit used in Color Dreams cartridges, Camerica's workaround generates glitch pulses that freeze the lock-out chip. These cartridges are shaped and colored slightly differently from Nintendo's official cartridges, though they still fit in the NES. All Camerica cartridges were originally produced gold-colored, and later silver. They feature a switch for use with European NES consoles.

In Lewis Galoob Toys, Inc. v. Nintendo of America, Inc, Galoob, distributor of Camerica products in the United States, was ruled not an infringer of the Copyright Act because the Game Genie was not a derivative work and was protected by fair use.

In Nintendo of America Inc. v. Camerica Corp (1991), it was held that it did not violate Nintendo's trademark for Camerica to advertise compatibility with the NES despite being an unlicensed distributor.

Camerica declared bankruptcy and ceased operations in 1993.

Games

Bee 52
Big Nose Freaks Out
Big Nose the Caveman
Dizzy the Adventurer
Fantastic Adventures of Dizzy
FireHawk
Linus Spacehead's Cosmic Crusade
Micro Machines
Mig 29 Soviet Fighter
Quattro Adventure
Quattro Arcade
Quattro Sports
Super Robin Hood
Stunt Kids
The Ultimate Stuntman

See also

List of Nintendo Entertainment System games

References

External links
The Warp Zone - Camerica, Codemasters, and Acemore

Unlicensed Nintendo hardware
Video game publishers
Defunct video game companies of Canada
Video game companies established in 1987
Video game companies disestablished in 1993